The Alfred Ceramic Art Museum at Alfred University in Alfred, New York, United States houses nearly 8,000 ceramic and glass objects by internationally known ceramic artists. While originally housed in 1,500 sq. ft. of exhibition space in the New York State College of Ceramics' Binns-Merrill Hall, the museum's new building was constructed in 2010 by KMW Architects to allow the museum to grow since the village of Alfred is known as a ceramics mecca.

Its collection includes ancient ceramics of anthropological interest, examples of historical and contemporary ceramic art and craft, and advanced ceramics created utilizing advanced ceramic engineering technology. While the museum has a public gallery on the second floor of Binns-Merrill Hall on the Alfred University Campus, the majority of its ceramic collection is housed in storage, awaiting completion of the new museum building. The new building will be located on the site of the former Davis Gym, on Pine Street just past its intersection with Main Street. Construction began June 2014 on a $10 million Alfred Museum of Ceramic Art. The university received a private donation to cover the cost of the new museum.

The museum is a teaching and research facility, and part of Alfred University.

References

External links
Official Site

Alfred University
Museums in Allegany County, New York
Art museums and galleries in New York (state)
University museums in New York (state)
Ceramics museums in the United States
University art museums and galleries in New York (state)